Sebkha el Melah, also known as Sebkhel el Melah or Sebkhet el Melah, is an endorheic salt lake in Béchar Province, southwestern Algeria.  The Oued Saoura drains into the lake. 

Geography
Sebkha el Melah is a salt lake that has formed in a basin in Béchar Province in southwestern Algeria, to the south of the Atlas Mountains. The rocky ridge of the Ougarta Range lies to the west and the sand dunes of the Grand Erg Occidental to the east. The lake is fed by the seasonal river Oued Saoura but most of the year the volume of water evaporated from the surface exceeds the volume of water flowing in, and a salt crust is formed. The basin has no outflow, and because the source of the water is continental rather than marine, the amount of salt deposited is limited. There are two bodies of water, the upper one pond-like, with a moderate degree of salinity and a biodiverse flora and fauna, and the lower one a sabkha or salt lake, with higher salinity, salt-encrusted margins and very little vegetation.

The bottom of the sabkha is usually dry and covered with a salty crust, mostly formed from halite. Periodically, heavy rains cause the Saoura to flood and water flows into the sabkha. Total dissolved solids increase as the crust partially dissolves and evaporation occurs. Some water infiltrates the clayey ground forming an impervious layer under which is an aquifer, saturated as far as sodium chloride is concerned. Evaporation of the water in the lake occurs, and after a few months, the sabkha dries up, and a new crust is formed.

Ecology
Sebkha el Melah has been designated as a Ramsar site since 2004. On land there are stands of tamarisk and various species of seed-bearing plants. Some agricultural activities take place, including the cultivation of date palms. Several species of reptile and amphibian are found in the locality, as well as crustaceans, fish and small mammals, and the site is of international importance because of the waterfowl that breed and raise their young here. The lakes are particularly productive because of the high temperatures experienced; more than 1% of the world populations of the ruddy shelduck (Tadorna ferruginea) and the ferruginous duck (Aythya nyroca) breed at Sebkha el Melah.

References

Lakes of Algeria
Ramsar sites in Algeria